Robert Luther Flurry, Jr. (November 15, 1933 – September 3, 2008) was a chemistry professor and researcher who authored three chemistry textbooks.  After serving in the U.S. Navy as a musician, he received his B.A., M.S., and Ph.D. from Emory University and completed his post-doctoral studies at Illinois Institute of Technology.  In 1962 he joined the faculty of the University of New Orleans and stayed there until his retirement. Flurry died of complications from Parkinson's disease.

References 
 Flurry, Robert L. (1968). Molecular Orbital Theories of Bonding in Organic Molecules.  M. Dekker.  LCCN: 68-13563
 Flurry, Robert L. (1980). Symmetry Groups : Theory and Chemical Applications.  Prentice-Hall.  ,  LCCN: 79-18729
 Flurry, Robert L. (1983). Quantum Chemistry : An Introduction.  Prentice-Hall.  ,  LCCN: 82-7715

External links
Obituary of Robert Luther Flurry, Jr.

1933 births
2008 deaths
20th-century American chemists
Illinois Institute of Technology alumni